Hamsterley is a village in County Durham, England. It is situated to the north of Consett and borders the hamlet of Low Westwood.

Colliery
It was known until recently as Hamsterley Colliery, after the large mining colliery situated to the south of the village by the south banks of the River Derwent. The colliery, halfway between Hamsterley and High Westwood, had opened in 1864 and closed on 2 February 1968.

Homonymous
Hamsterley Hall was the birthplace of the hunting novelist Robert Smith Surtees, author of Jorrocks' Jaunts and Jollities. One of two villages of this name in County Durham, Hamsterley should not be confused with the larger village of Hamsterley, near Bishop Auckland, 20 miles to the south.

References

External links

Villages in County Durham
Consett